The Order of Manas is the second highest order of Kyrgyzstan. The order is awarded by the President of Kyrgyzstan. Established in 1996, the order recognizes outstanding service to Kyrgyzstan.

Gallery

Notable recipients
Almazbek Atambayev. former President of Kyrgyzstan (1 December 2011)
Sooronbay Jeenbekov, President of Kyrgyzstan (2015)
Sopubek Begaliev, founder of the Assembly of People of the Kyrgyz Republic (1997)
Abibilla Kudayberdiev, former Minister of Defense of Kyrgyzstan
Xi Jinping, General Secretary of the Chinese Communist Party and President of the People's Republic of China (13 June 2019)
Vladimir Putin, President of Russia (22 November 2017)
Nursultan Nazarbayev, first President of Kazakhstan
Kofi Annan, former Secretary-General of the United Nations
Kuluypa Konduchalova, Kyrgyz-Soviet teacher, politician and cultural minister.
Sapar Isakov, former Prime Minister of Kyrgyzstan
Turdakun Usubaliev, former First Secretary of the Central Committee of the Communist Party of Kyrgyzstan.

See also
Orders, decorations, and medals of Kyrgyzstan

References

Orders, decorations, and medals of Kyrgyzstan
Awards established in 1996